Stadionul Dacia may refer to:

 Stadionul Dacia (Mioveni)
 Stadionul Dacia (Orăştie)